The 2011 AON Open Challenger was a professional tennis tournament played on clay courts. It was the ninth edition of the tournament which was part of the 2011 ATP Challenger Tour. It took place in Genoa, Italy between 5 and 11 September 2011.

Singles main-draw entrants

Seeds

 1 Rankings are as of August 29, 2011.

Other entrants
The following players received wildcards into the singles main draw:
  Pablo Andújar
  Andea Basso
  Edoardo Eremin
  Francesco Picco

The following players received entry from the qualifying draw:
  Benjamin Balleret
  Guillermo Durán
  Thomas Fabbiano
  Michael Linzer

The following players received entry as a lucky loser into the singles main draw:
  Enrico Burzi
  Renzo Olivo

Champions

Singles

 Martin Kližan def.  Leonardo Mayer, 6–3, 6–1

Doubles

 Dustin Brown /  Horacio Zeballos def.  Jordan Kerr /  Travis Parrott, 6–2, 7–5

External links
Official Website

AON Open Challenger
AON Open Challenger
Clay court tennis tournaments
September 2011 sports events in Italy
21st century in Genoa
2011 in Italian tennis